Samantha Tolj (born on 12 June 1982 in Perth, Western Australia) is an actress.

Her father is Croatian and mother is Anglo Celtic Australian.
Tolj began professional acting guest starring on Stingers, MDA, and a big part in an episode of Blue Heelers. The Heelers producers were impressed enough to bring her back for two episodes playing a prostitute in the eighth and ninth seasons of the show.

Tolj later joined the main cast, playing Kelly O'Rourke, a police constable, in 2004 as one of four new cast members. This led to her nomination in the 2005 Logie Awards for Best New Talent. She remained with the show until it ended in 2006. In 2007, Tolj played a guest role in McLeod's Daughters.  In 2010 Tolj joined the cast of Home and Away.

Filmography

References

External links
 

1982 births
Australian people of British descent
Australian people of Croatian descent
Australian people of Irish descent
Australian television actresses
Living people